Domo Arigato (aka Thank you very much) is a 3-D film which was produced in 1972 and shown in limited theatrical runs, mainly larger markets. It was re-released in 1991. A med school drop out and GI (Jason Ledger) returning from a tour in Vietnam travels the scenic Japanese countryside with an American tourist from Kansas (Bonnie Sher) who harbors a secret in this travelogue romantic melodrama. The use of the SpaceVision 3-D camera rig provides some stunning stereoscopic effects throughout. This was Arch Oboler's follow up 3-D film after The Bubble (1966).

References 
Movie review from The New York Times

External links

1972 films
1970s 3D films
Films set in Japan
Japan in non-Japanese culture
American romance films
1970s American films
1990s Japanese films